Japan is an archipelago of 14,125 islands, of which approximately 260 are inhabited. Japan is the largest  island country in East Asia and the fourth largest in the world.

According to a survey conducted by the Japan Coast Guard in 1987, the number of islands in Japan was 6,852. At that time, the survey only counted islands with coastlines of 100 meters or more that were shown on paper maps.
On February 28, 2023, the Geospatial Information Authority of Japan announced that the number of islands had been updated to 14,125 through a recount using digital maps. Since there is no international standard for counting islands, only islands with a coastline of 100 meters or more were counted, as in the past. According to the GSI, advances in surveying technology and the detailed representation of topographic features through digital mapping contributed to this announcement.

Main islands 

The four main islands of Japan are:
Hokkaido – the northernmost and second largest main island.
Honshu – the largest and most populous island, with the capital Tokyo.
Kyushu – the third largest main island and the nearest to the Asian continent.
Shikoku – the smallest main island, located between Honshu and Kyushu.

Hokkaido prefecture 
 Ōshima
 Okushiri Island
 Teuri Island
 Rebun Island
 Rishiri Island
 Yagishiri Island
Kamome island

Islands of Honshu in the Sea of Japan 
 Awashima Island, Niigata
 Kanmurijima
 Kutsujima, Kyoto
 Mitsukejima
 Nanatsujima archipelago
 Notojima
 Oki Islands (Oki Islands)
Dōgo
Nakanoshima
Nishinoshima
Chiburijima
 
 Sado
 Takashima, Shimane
 Tobishima (Yamagata)

 Tsunoshima
 Umashima, Shimane

Islands in Tokyo Bay 
 Dream Island (Yume No Shima)
 Odaiba
 Sarushima (natural)
 
 
 
 
 Tokyo International Airport
 
 
 
 Wakasu

Islands in Osaka Bay 
 Maishima
 Yumeshima
 
 Kansai International Airport
 Kobe Airport
 Port Island
 Rokkō Island
 
 Wakayama Marina City

Islands in Ise Bay 
 Chūbu Centrair International Airport (artificial island)
 Kami-shima
 Kashiko Island
 Kozukumi Island
 Mikimoto Pearl Island

Islands in Mutsu Bay 
 Ōshima
 Taijima

Nanpō Islands (Nanpō Shotō) 

Izu Islands
Aogashima
Hachijō
Izu Ōshima
Kōzu
Miyake-jima
Mikura-jima
Nii-jima
Shikine
Toshima
Tori-shima
Udonejima
Ogasawara Islands (Bonin Islands)

Mukojima Rettō
Chichijima
Hahajima
Mukojima
Kazan Rettō (Volcano Islands)
 Nishinoshima
 Kita Iwo Jima (North Iwo Jima)
 Iwo Jima
 Minami Iwo Jima (South Iwo Jima)

Other Japanese islands 
Minami Torishima (Marcus Island)
Enoshima
Okino Torishima (Parece Vela)

Islands around Kyushu 
Most of these are located in the East China Sea.
Amakusa
Shimoshima Island, Amakusa
Kamishima Island, Amakusa
Nagashima Island, Kagoshima
Aoshima
Gotō Islands
Danjo Islands

Hashima
Hirado
Iki
Koshikijima Islands
Shimokoshiki-jima
Kamikoshiki-jima
Tsushima
Ukushima

Islands around Shikoku
Kuro-shima (Ehime)
Nii Ōshima

Ryukyu Islands (Nansei-shotō)

Satsunan Islands
The northern half is administratively part of Kagoshima Prefecture and Kyushu.

Ōsumi Islands 
The North-Eastern Group:
Tanegashima
 Yakushima
 Kuchinoerabujima
 Mageshima
The North-Western Group:
 Iōjima
 Shōwa Iōjima
 Kuroshima
Takeshima

Tokara Islands 
The Shichi-tō: 
 Kuchinoshima
 Nakanoshima (Kagoshima)
 Gajajima
 Suwanosejima
 Akusekijima
 Tairajima
 Kodakarajima
 Takarajima

Amami Islands 
 Amami Ōshima
 Kikaijima
 Kakeromajima
 Yoroshima
 Ukeshima
 Tokunoshima
 Okinoerabujima
 Yoronjima

Ryukyu Islands (Ryūkyū-shotō)
The Southern Half, Okinawa Prefecture

Okinawa Islands 
The Central Group or Ryukyu proper:
 Okinawa Island
 Kumejima
 Iheyajima
 Izenajima
 Agunijima
 Iejima
 Io-Torishima (Iōtorishima)
 Kerama Islands
 Tokashikijima
 Zamamijima
 Akajima
 Gerumajima
 Daitō Islands
 Kitadaitojima
 Minamidaitōjima
 Okidaitōjima

Sakishima Islands 
Also known as the Further Isles:
 Miyako Islands
 Miyako-jima
 Ikema
 Ogami
 Irabu Island
 Shimoji
 Kurima-jima
 Minna
 Tarama
 Yaeyama Islands
 Iriomote
 Ishigaki
 Taketomi
 Kohama
 Kuroshima
 Aragusuku
 Hatoma
 Yubujima
 Hateruma
 Yonaguni
 Senkaku Islands - controlled by Japan, disputed by China and Taiwan.
 Uotsurijima
 Kuba Jima
 Taisho Jima
 Kita Kojima
 Minami Kojima

Seto Inland Sea islands 

 Kasaoka Islands
 Takashima Island (Okayama) 高島 (岡山県笠岡市)
 Shiraishi Island
 Kitagi Island, 北木島
 Obishi Island, 大飛島
 Kobi Island, 小飛島
 Manabeshima, 真鍋島
 Mushima Island (Okayama), 六島 (岡山県)
 Shiwaku Islands
 Awaji
 Etajima
 Kurahashi-jima
 Inujima
 Itsukushima (popularly known as "Miyajima")
 Shōdoshima
 Naoshima Islands
 Suō-Ōshima, Yamaguchi
 Himeshima, Ōita
 Aoshima, Ehime
 Hashira Island
 Okamura Island
 Ōshima (Ehime)
 Mukaishima Island, Hiroshima
 Ōmishima Island, Ehime
 Ōkunoshima (often called "Rabbit Island")

Islands in lakes 
 Daikon-island
 Bentenjima in Lake Tōya
 Bentenjima in Lake Hamana

Other artificial islands 
 Chūbu Centrair International Airport
 Dejima
 New Kitakyushu Airport
 , off Hakodate (artificial)
   (artificial)
 Wakaejima (artificial)
 Island City, Fukuoka (artificial)

Claims but does not control

The Northern Territories 
There are four disputed Kuril Islands that are controlled by Russia and claimed by Japan. These islands are called the Chishima Islands.

Iturup -  
Kunashir -  
Shikotan -  
Habomai Islands -

Others 
 Liancourt Rocks (Dokdo/Takeshima) - controlled by South Korea, disputed by Japan and North Korea.

Former 
 South Seas Mandate (1919–1947) - part of the Japanese colonial empire until its defeat in 1945. Formally revoked by the United Nations in 1947. The Commonwealth of the Northern Mariana Islands later became a U.S. territory. 
 Taiwan and Penghu (1895–1945) - part of the Japanese colonial empire until its defeat in 1945. Returned to the Republic of China in 1945.
 Karafuto (1905–1949) - the southern half of the island of Sakhalin, controlled by Japan after the Russo-Japanese War. Japan lost control of Karafuto after its invasion by the Soviet Union during World War II. Formally abolished as a legal entity by Japan in 1949. Japan in addition controlled the northern half of Sakhalin between 1920 and 1925, during and after the Russian Civil War.

Largest islands of Japan 

These are the 50 largest islands of Japan. It excludes the disputed Kuril islands known as the northern territories.

See also 
 Geography of Japan
 Japanese archipelago
 List of islands of Japan by area
 List of islands
 Names of Japan

References 

Japan, List of islands of
Islands